Johan ("Han") Frederik Drijver (11 March 1927 in Eindhoven – 10 October 1986 in Vlaardingen) was a Dutch field hockey player who competed in the 1948 Summer Olympics and the 1952 Summer Olympics.

In the 1948 Summer Olympics, he was a member of the Dutch field hockey team, which won the bronze medal. He played all seven matches as a back.

Four years later, he won the silver medal as part of the Dutch team at the 1952 Summer Olympics. He played all three matches as a back.

External links
 
  Dutch Olympic Committee
profile

1927 births
1986 deaths
Dutch male field hockey players
Olympic field hockey players of the Netherlands
Field hockey players at the 1948 Summer Olympics
Field hockey players at the 1952 Summer Olympics
Olympic silver medalists for the Netherlands
Olympic bronze medalists for the Netherlands
Sportspeople from Eindhoven
Olympic medalists in field hockey
Medalists at the 1952 Summer Olympics
Medalists at the 1948 Summer Olympics
20th-century Dutch people